Beta-1,3-N-acetylglucosaminyltransferase lunatic fringe, (Lunatic Fringe), is a protein encoded in humans by the LFNG gene.

This gene encodes a member of the glycosyltransferase superfamily. The encoded protein is a single-pass type II Golgi membrane protein that functions as a fucose-specific glycosyltransferase, adding an N-acetylglucosamine to the fucose residue of a group of signaling receptors involved in regulating cell fate decisions during development. Mutations in this gene have been associated with autosomal recessive spondylocostal dysostosis 3. Alternatively spliced transcript variants that encode different isoforms have been described, however, not all variants have been fully characterized.

Function 
LFNG is a gene whose role in embryonic development is to establish the anterior boundary of somites, which will eventually develop in vertebrae, ribs, and dermis.  Lunatic Fringe responds to certain threshold ratios of retinoic acid and FGF-8 in order to mark the anterior boundary of somites while another transcription factor, Hairy, responds to different threshold ratios of retinoic acid and FGF-8 to form the posterior boundaries of somites.

Clinical significance 
A defect associated with Lfng mutations is spondylocostal dysostosis.  Spondylocostal dysostosis is characterized by segmentation problems in the developing vertebrae resulting in fusion or lack of vertebrae along with abnormalities in the ribs.  Clinically, spondylocostal dysostosis presents as a shortened neck and trunk relative total height and a mild form of scoliosis.  Respiratory problems are also common in spondylocostal dysostosis because of the shortened trunk.

A knockout model for Lfng has been created in mice, and without Lfng, mice have shorter tails, and impaired rib, lung, and somite development.  A deficiency of Lfng in male mice has also been associated with lack of spermatozoa in the epididymis of many mice; however, spermatogenesis was not impaired.  Rather, the male mice were subfertile. In female mice, Lfng deficiency led to infertility because of abnormal folliculogenesis.  Further examination showed that oocytes from these female mice did not complete meiotic maturation.  However, there are other studies that contradict this stating that not all female mice deficient of Lfng are infertile.  A possible explanation for this difference between these studies is that the Lfng alleles were functional different, however, this is unlikely.  More likely is that this discrepancy results from differences in the genetic background of the mice or husbandry and colony conditions.

Impact of mutation 
Lunatic Fringe is a transcription factor that plays a crucial role in the development of the somites. Somites give rise to the skeletal muscle, the axial skeleton, the tendons, and the dorsal dermis. The somites are formed via the clock-wave front model, and as each somite is formed, each cell receives a burst of FGF8 (a signaling molecule). Somites are formed anterior to posterior, and since FGF8 has a short half-life, this leads to a greater concentration of FGF8 in the posterior, and a lesser concentration in the anterior. Lunatic fringe responds to the lower concentration of FGF8 in the anterior and leads these cells to their developmental fate. Mutation of the Lunatic Fringe gene can cause severe Spondylocostal Dysostosis, which involves vertebral segmentation defects and rib abnormalities. A mutation was discovered in which a conservative phenylalanine close to the active site of the enzyme mutates, leading to the enzymatic inactivation of Lunatic Fringe. A “knock-out” model has been created using mice. In mice, Lunatic Fringe plays a crucial role in the Notch signaling pathway during the formation of somites, and a mutation in this gene leads to somites with irregular shapes and a defect in the anterior-posterior formation.

References

Further reading

External links 
 GeneReviews/NIH/NCBI/UW entry on Spondylocostal Dysostosis, Autosomal Recessive